Phryneta semirasa is a species of beetle in the family Cerambycidae. It was described by Dohrn in 1885. It is known from Tanzania, the Democratic Republic of the Congo, Mozambique, Zimbabwe, Malawi, and Zambia.

References

Phrynetini
Beetles described in 1885